Women have been a vital part of history and culture in the geographic area known as Oceania today. Women in Oceania have diverse cultural identities which relate to the geography of the continent and the social structures of the people living there. Their evolution, culture and history coincide with the history of Oceania itself.

History

Early women in Oceania 
Women in New Zealand are the women who live in or are from the multi-cultural society of New Zealand. The first female settlers in New Zealand were not from Europe. They were from the Māori people.

Colonization 
The person credited to be the first white-skinned European woman to settle in New Zealand was Charlotte Badger (she later had a daughter known as Catherine). The first known Australian settlers arrived on the Cocos islands in 1826.

Traditional roles among women in Oceania 

In East Timor, due to traditional roles, women are unable to inherit or own property and face the cultural notion that women normally belong at the home. The role of Kiribati women is described in the publication Kiribati, A Situation Analysis of Children, Women and Youth (2005) as "largely defined by her age and marital status". Prestige is inherent to the married Kiribati woman, but she is considerably under the authority of her husband.

Historically, there was a strong "gendered division of labor" between women and men of Palau.

Tongan society who traditionally have a "high position in Tongan society" due to the country's partly matriarchal foundation but "can't own land", "subservient" to husbands in terms of "domestic affairs" and "by custom and law, must dress modestly, usually in Mother Hubbard-style dresses hemmed well below the knee".

Women participate in the traditional music of Tuvalu which consists of a number of dances, including the fatele and the fakanau.

Promoting equality for women in Oceania 
One of the organizations that promote empowerment and foster gender equality for the women of East Timor is the United Nations Development Fund for Women (UNIFEM).

At present, the women of Indonesia are also venturing actively into the realm of national development, and working as active members of organizations that focus and act on women's issues and concerns.

The women of New Zealand have the same level of equality with men, and are conferred the same level of respect as well.

In relation to the labor force, based on data in 2006, Vanuatuan female workers comprised 49.6% of the workforce of Vanuatu. At present, women in Guam - together with Guamanian men - participate in jobs that belong to the wage economy category; but there are also women - among men - who work in the agricultural sector.

In March 2011, International Women's Day was celebrated on Christmas Island for the honor of its female residents.  The event was held in order to convey the theme of "what it means to be a woman living on Christmas Island".

Niuean women have "some rights" in relation to land tenure and inheritance of real property, but such rights are not "as strong" as those that belong to the men of Niue.

Education 
Modern-day Fijian women have attained better access to education in recent years.

Tuvaluan women have access to secondary education at Motufoua Secondary School on Vaitupu and Fetuvalu Secondary School, a day school operated by the Church of Tuvalu, on Funafuti.

Women's health in Oceania 
In the Solomon Islands female life expectancy at birth was at 66.7 years as compared to male life expectancy at birth at 64.9 in 2007. 1990–1995 fertility rate was at 5.5 births per woman.

Sexual harassment and violence 
Rape cases and sexual slavery were allegedly committed by East Timorese pro-integration militias during the September 1999 crisis in East Timor.

See also

Sovereign states in Oceania 
 Women in Australia
 Women and government in Australia
 Women in East Timor
 Women in Fiji
 Women in Indonesia
 Women in Kiribati
 Women in the Marshall Islands
 Women in the Federated States of Micronesia
 Women in Nauru
 Women in New Zealand
 Women's suffrage in New Zealand
 Women in Palau
 Women in Papua New Guinea
 Women in Samoa
 Women in the Solomon Islands
 Women in Tonga
 Women in Tuvalu
 Women in Vanuatu

Dependent territories (Australia)
 Women in Christmas Island
 Women in the Cocos (Keeling) Islands
 Women in Norfolk Island

Dependent territories (Chile)
 Women in Easter Island

Dependent territories (France)
 Women in French Polynesia
 Women in New Caledonia
 Women in Wallis and Futuna

Dependent territories (New Zealand)
 Women in the Cook Islands
 Women in Niue
 Women in Tokelau

Dependent territories (UK)
 Women in the Pitcairn Islands

Dependent territories (USA)
 Women in American Samoa
 Women in Guam
 Women in Hawaii
 Women in the Northern Mariana Islands

Related topics 
 Indigenous peoples of Oceania

References

Citations

Sources

External links